Henri Fluchère (1898–1987) was a chairman of the Société Française Shakespeare and a notable literary critic. He played an important role in the establishment of an Elizabethan research centre in Aix-en-Provence and contributed to the Golden Guides series a volume on wines.  He was also responsible for the libretto in Darius Milhaud's L'opéra du gueux, Op. 171 (1937), a ballad opera in three acts.  In 1966 his Laurence Sterne: From Tristram to Yorick, originally in French, won the Scott Moncrieff Prize for its translation by Barbara Bray.

Fluchère's nephew Henri André Fluchère (1914 - 1990) was the author of the Golden Guide to Wines, and illustrated other Golden Guides. He was an illustrator of science and other technical textbooks, and wrote books on art, especially watercolor. He was a registered heraldic illustrator with various museums in New York City. He immigrated to the USA in 1925. He enlisted in the US Army before World War II in Military Intelligence as an Interpreter (French) as a Master Sergeant with the 28th Infantry Division. After the 28th Infantry Division crossed the Rhine River into Germany, his services were no longer needed and he was reassigned to The Stars and Stripes Newspaper in Paris as an illustrator and artist. After returning from World War II, he worked for Superman Magazine as an illustrator. In the 1950s he was Art Director for McGraw Hill in their textbook division.  In the late 1950s he established Art Tech Services, in Irvington, NY where he lived and raised his family.

References
 Fluchère, Henri. "Défense de la Lucidité." In T. S. Eliot: A Symposium, edited by Richard March and Tambimuttu. T. S. Eliot: A Symposium. London: Editions Poetry, 1948.
 Maguin, Jean-Marie. "Shakespeare Studies in France since 1960." Internet Shakespeare Editions. May 2002. (accessed 2010-09-20).

French literary critics
Shakespearean scholars
Writers from Marseille
1898 births
1987 deaths
French male dramatists and playwrights
French male poets
Winners of the Prix Broquette-Gonin (literature)